William Stauffer was an American politician. He served as the thirteenth mayor of Lancaster, Pennsylvania from 1873 to 1877.

References

Mayors of Lancaster, Pennsylvania